Zăvoiu may refer to several villages in Romania:

 Zăvoiu, a village in Sâmbăta Commune, Bihor County
 Zăvoiu, a village in Mogoșani Commune, Dâmbovița County
 Zăvoiu, the former name of Zăvoi Commune, Caraș-Severin County